Forvie was a village in what is now the Forvie National Nature Reserve, located at the modern location of Rockend some fourteen miles north of Aberdeen. It was one of several settlements in north-east Scotland that have been overcome by sand dunes.

There are visible remains of the 12th-century church of St Adamnan and other remains were found by a survey in the 1950s. Little is known of the village, which is believed to have been abandoned during the 15th century. There are records, however, of good oats harvests.

References

Former populated places in Scotland